The Aldabra giant tortoise (Aldabrachelys gigantea) is a species of tortoise in the family Testudinidae. The species is endemic to the Seychelles, with the nominate subspecies, A. g. gigantea native to Aldabra atoll. It is one of the largest tortoises in the world. Historically, giant tortoises were found on many of the western Indian Ocean islands, as well as Madagascar, and the fossil record indicates giant tortoises once occurred on every continent and many islands with the exception of Australia and Antarctica. 

Many of the Indian Ocean species were thought to be driven to extinction by over-exploitation by European sailors, and they were all seemingly extinct by 1840 with the exception of the Aldabran giant tortoise on the island atoll of Aldabra. Although some remnant individuals of A. g. hololissa and A. g. arnoldi may remain in captivity, in recent times, these have all been reduced as subspecies of A. gigantea.

Description

The carapace of A. gigantea is a brown or tan in color with a high, domed shape. The species has stocky, heavily scaled legs to support its heavy body. The neck of the Aldabra giant tortoise is very long, even for its great size, which helps the animal to exploit tree branches up to a meter from the ground as a food source.

Another study found body masses of up to  most commonplace.

Nomenclature and systematics
This species is widely referred to as Aldabrachelys gigantea, but in recent times, attempts were made to use the name Dipsochelys as Dipsochelys dussumieri.  After a debate that lasted two years with many submissions, the ICZN eventually decided to conserve the name Testudo gigantea over this recently used name (ICZN 2013). This also affected the genus name for the species, establishing Aldabrachelys gigantea as nomen protectum.

Four subspecies are currently recognized. A trinomial authority in parentheses indicates that the subspecies was originally described in a genus other than Aldabrachelys:

 A. g. gigantea , Aldabra giant tortoise from the Seychelles island of Aldabra
 A. g. arnoldi , Arnold's giant tortoise from the Seychelles island of Mahé
 A. g. daudinii † , Daudin's giant tortoise, from the Seychelles island of Mahé (extinct 1850)
 A. g. hololissa , Seychelles giant tortoise, from the Seychelles islands of Cerf, Cousine, Frégate, Mahé, Praslin, Round, and Silhouette

The subspecific name, daudinii, is in honor of French zoologist François Marie Daudin.

Genetic evidence suggests that A. gigantea is most closely related to the extinct giant tortoise Aldabrachelys abrupta from Madagascar, from which it is estimaged to have diverged from approximately 4.5 million years ago.

Range and distribution

The main population of the Aldabra giant tortoise resides on the islands of the Aldabra Atoll in the Seychelles. The atoll has been protected from human influence and is home to some 100,000 giant tortoises, the world's largest population of the animal. Smaller populations of A. gigantea in the Seychelles exist on Frégate Island and in the Sainte Anne Marine National Park (e.g. Moyenne Island),, where they are a popular tourist attraction. 

Another isolated population of the species resides on the island of Changuu, near Zanzibar. Other captive populations exist in conservation parks in Mauritius and Rodrigues. The tortoises exploit many different kinds of habitat, including grasslands, low scrub, mangrove swamps, and coastal dunes.

Ecology

Habitat
A peculiar habitat has coevolved due to the grazing pressures of the tortoises: "tortoise turf", a comingling of 20+ species of grasses and herbs. Many of these distinct plants are naturally dwarfed and grow their seeds not from the tops of the plants, but closer to the ground to avoid the tortoises' close-cropping jaws.

As the largest animal in its environment, the Aldabra tortoise performs a role similar to that of the elephant. Their vigorous search for food fells trees and creates pathways used by other animals.

Feeding ecology

Primarily herbivores, Aldabra giant tortoises eat grasses, leaves, woody plant stems, and fruit. They occasionally indulge in small invertebrates and carrion, even eating the bodies of other dead tortoises. In captivity, Aldabra giant tortoises are known to consume fruits such as apples and bananas, as well as compressed vegetable pellets. In 2020, a female Aldabra giant tortoise on Fregate Island was observed hunting and eating a juvenile lesser noddy, indicating that the species was in the process of learning to catch birds. 

Little fresh water is available for drinking in the tortoises' natural habitat, so they obtain most of their moisture from their food. 

The Aldabra giant tortoise has two main varieties of shells, related to their habitat. Specimens living in habitats with food available primarily on the ground have more dome-shaped shells with the front extending downward over the neck. Those living in an environment with food available higher above the ground have more flattened top shells with the front raised to allow the neck to extend upward freely.

Tortoise turf
The Aldabra giant tortoise is a herbivorous animal, spending much of its time browsing for food in its surrounding well-vegetated environment. The Aldabra giant tortoise is known to be found in places that are commonly known as "tortoise turf". Tortoise turf is composed of:

Behavior

Aldabra tortoises are found both individually and in herds, which tend to gather mostly on open grasslands. They are most active in the mornings, when they spend time grazing and browsing for food. They dig wallows, hide under shade trees or in small caves, as well as submerge themselves in pools to keep cool during the heat of the day.

Lifespan

Large tortoises are among the longest-lived animals. Some individual Aldabra giant tortoises are thought to be over 200 years of age, but this is difficult to verify because they tend to outlive their human observers. Adwaita was reputedly one of four brought by British seamen from the Seychelles Islands as gifts to Robert Clive of the British East India Company in the 18th century, and came to Calcutta Zoo in 1875. At his death in March 2006 at the Kolkata (formerly Calcutta) Zoo in India, Adwaita is reputed to have reached the longest ever measured lifespan of 255 years (birth year 1750). 

As of 2022, Jonathan, a Seychelles giant tortoise, is thought to be the oldest living giant tortoise at the age of  years. Esmeralda, an Aldabra giant tortoise, is second at the age of  years, since the death of Harriet, a Galapagos giant tortoise, at 175. An Aldabra giant tortoise living on Changuu off Zanzibar is reportedly  years old.

Breeding

Mating takes place between February and May, and in July-September females lay between 9 and 25 hard-shelled  eggs in a 30 cm deep nest.  Usually, less than half of the eggs are fertile. Females can produce multiple clutches of eggs in a year. After incubating for about eight months, the tiny, independent young hatch between October and December.

In captivity, oviposition dates vary.  Tulsa Zoo maintains a small herd of Aldabra tortoises and they have reproduced several times since 1999.  One female typically lays eggs in November and again in January, providing the weather is warm enough to go outside for laying.  The zoo also incubates their eggs artificially, keeping two separate incubators at 27 °C (81 °F) and 30 °C (86 °F).  On average, the eggs kept at the latter temperature hatch in 107 days.

Conservation

The Aldabra giant tortoise has an unusually long history of organized conservation. Albert Günther of the British Museum, who later moved to the Natural History Museum of London, enlisting Charles Darwin and other famous scientists to help him, worked with the government of Mauritius to establish a preserve at the end of the 19th century. The related, but distinct, species of giant tortoise from the Seychelles islands, Seychelles giant tortoise A. g. hololissa and Arnold's giant tortoise A. g. arnoldi, were the subject of a captive-breeding and reintroduction program by the Nature Protection Trust of Seychelles. 

A reference genome and low-coverage sequencing analyses has looked at revealing within- and among-island genetic differentiation within the Aldabra population, as well as assigning likely origins for zoo-housed individuals. This has managed to differentiate between individuals sampled on Malabar and Grande Terre and resolve the exact origin of zoo-housed individuals.

References

External links

Sea World Animal Bytes
Aldabra giant tortoise at EMY System and World Turtle Database
Seychelles Giant Tortoise Conservation Project
Encyclopedia of Life

Aldabrachelys
Turtles of Africa
Fauna of Seychelles
Reptiles described in 1812
Articles containing video clips
Taxobox binomials not recognized by IUCN